Almaqah or Almuqh was the Moon god of the ancient Yemeni kingdom of Saba'. He was also worshipped in the kingdom of Dʿmt, which later became the kingdom of Aksum in Ethiopia and Eritrea.

Characteristics
Jacques Ryckmans states, 
The ruling dynasty of Saba' regarded themselves as his seed. Almaqah is represented on monuments by a cluster of lightning bolts surrounding a curved, sickle-like weapon. Bulls were sacred to him.

Temples
Both the Barran Temple and the Awwam temple were dedicated to Almaqah.

See also
Ancient history of Yemen

References

External links

Arabian gods
Lunar gods
Sabaeans